According to the French national institute of statistics INSEE, the 2018 census counted nearly 9 million immigrants (foreign-born people) in France, representing 14.0% of the total population. Eurostat estimated the foreign-born population to be 9.1 million, corresponding to 14.1% of the French population as of January 2019.

In 2008, a previous INSEE census estimated that 7.8 million foreign-born immigrants and 7.5 million direct descendants of immigrants (born in France with at least one immigrant parent) lived in France, representing a total of 14.8 million people, or 25% of the total population in metropolitan France (62.1 million in 2008). Among them, about 5.5 million are of European origin (Portuguese, Spaniards, Italians, Britons and several people from Eastern European countries.), 6 million of North African (either Arab-Berber) origin, 2 million of Sub-Saharan African origin and 1 million of Turkish  origin.

The area with the largest proportion of immigrants is the Parisian urban area (Greater Paris), where almost 40% of immigrants lived in 2012. Other regions with important immigrant populations are Rhône-Alpes (Lyon) and Provence-Alpes-Côte d'Azur (Marseille).

The Paris region is a magnet for immigrants, hosting one of the largest concentrations of immigrants in Europe. As of 2006, about 45% of people (6 million) living in the region were either immigrant (25%) or born to at least one immigrant parent (20%).

Among the 802,000 newborns in metropolitan France in 2010, 27.3% had one or both parents foreign-born, and about one quarter (23.9%) had one parent or both born outside of Europe. Including grandparents, about 22% of newborns in France between 2006 and 2008 had at least one foreign-born grandparent (9% born in another European country, 8% born in Maghreb and 2% born in another region of the world).

History

France's population dynamics began to change in the middle of the 19th century, as France joined the Industrial Revolution. The pace of industrial growth attracted millions of European immigrants over the next century, with especially large numbers arriving from Poland, Belgium, Portugal, Italy, and Spain. In the wake of the First World War, in which France suffered six million casualties, significant numbers of workers from French colonies came. By 1930, the Paris region alone had a North African Muslim population of 70,000.

1945–1974
Right after the Second World War, immigration to France significantly increased. During the period of reconstruction, France lacked labor, and as a result, the French government was eager to recruit immigrants coming from all over Europe, the Americas, Africa and Asia.

Although there was a presence of, Vietnamese in France since the late 19th century (mostly students and workers), a wave of Vietnamese migrated to the country after the Battle of Dien Bien Phu and the Geneva Accords, which granted Vietnam its independence from France in 1954. These migrants consisted of those who were loyal to the colonial government and those married to French colonists. Following the partition of Vietnam, students and professionals from South Vietnam continued to arrive in France. Although many initially returned to the country after a few years, as the Vietnam War situation worsened, a majority decided to remain in France and brought their families over as well.

This period also saw a significant wave of immigrants from Algeria. As the Algerian War started in 1954, there were already 200,000 Algerian immigrants in France. However, because of the tension between the Algerians and the French, these immigrants were no longer welcome. This conflict between the two sides led to the Paris Massacre of 17 October 1961, when the police used force against an Algerian demonstration on the streets of Paris. After the war, after Algeria gained its independence, the free circulation between France and Algeria was once again allowed, and the number of Algerian immigrants started to increase drastically. From 1962 to 1975, the Algerian immigrant population increased from 350,000 to 700,000. Many of these immigrants were known as the "harkis," and the others were known as the "pieds-noirs." The "harkis" were Algerians who supported the French during the Algerian War; once the war was over, they were deeply resented by other Algerians, and thus had to flee to France. The "pieds-noirs" were Europeans settlers who moved to Algeria, but migrated back to France since 1962 when Algeria declared independence.

Additionally, the number of Pakistani and Japanese immigrants also increased during this period. There was also a great number of students and workers from former French colonies in Africa.

With this massive influx of immigrants, France became an asylum for refugees. According to the convention in Geneva, refugee status was granted to four out of five immigrant applicants. Many of these refugees came from countries in Eastern Europe (i.e. Hungary) and Latin America, because they feared the dictatorship in their home countries.

Although the majority of immigrants at this time came from rural regions, only 6% of them were willing to work in agriculture. About two-thirds of the immigrants worked in mining, steel, construction, and automotive industries. Approximately 12% of male immigrants and the majority of female immigrants worked in domestic services, restoration, and commerce (as for French women, a woman working was subject to her husband's authorisation until 1965.) Minor and aged immigrants usually worked in craftsmanship and small scale trades.

1974–present
During the 1970s, France simultaneously faced economic crisis and allowed immigrants (mostly from the Muslim world) to permanently settle in France with their families and to acquire French citizenship. It resulted in hundreds of thousands of Muslims, especially to the larger cities, living in subsidized public housing and suffering from very high unemployment rates. Alongside this, France renounced its policy of assimilation, instead pursuing a policy of integration.

In 1974, France restricted immigration from its former colonies.

According to an Ipsos poll in September 2019, 65% responded that accepting migrants did not improve the situation in France and 45% responded that accepting migrants deprived the French of social services.

In 2019, 46.5% of all immigrants were born in Africa, 35.3% were born in Europe, 14.7% in Asia and 5.4% in the Americas and Oceania. In 2020, non-EU citizens had employment rates less than 50% in the southern and southwestern regions of France and in the north and northeastern regions and was above 65% only in the Burgundy region.

Immigration flows

By region of origin
Immigration to France exceeded 200,000 in recent years, as shown in table below.

By country

Recent immigrants arriving to France as per 2014:

The immigrant population

In 2014 The National Institute of Statistics (INSEE, for its acronym in French) published a study reporting that the number of Spanish, Portuguese, and Italian immigrants in France between 2009 and 2012 has doubled.
As determined by the French Institute, this increase resulting from the financial crisis that hit several European countries in that period, has pushed up the number of Europeans settled in France.
Statistics on Spanish immigrants in France show a growth of 107 percent between 2009 and 2012, i.e. in this period went from 5300 to 11,000 people.
Of the total of 229,000 new foreigners coming to France in 2012, nearly 8% were Portuguese, British 5%, Spanish 5%, Italians 4%, Germans 4%, Romanians 3%, and Belgians 3%.

With the increase of Spanish, Portuguese and Italians in France, the weight of European immigrants arrived in 2012 to 46 percent, while this percentage for African reached 30%, with a presence in Morocco (7%), Algeria (7%) and Tunisia (3%).
Meanwhile, 14 percent of all immigrants who settled in France that year were from Asian countries - 3% of China and 2% in Turkey, while in America and Oceania constitute 10% of Americans and Brazilians accounted for higher percentage, 2 percent each.

In 2008, according to The National Institute of Statistics (INSEE, for its acronym in French), there were 12 million immigrants and their direct descendants (2nd generation) making up about 20% of the population. with an immigrant defined as a foreign born person without French citizenship at birth. Without considering citizenship at birth, people not born in metropolitan France and their direct descendants made up 30% of the population aged 18–50 in metropolitan France in 2008.

In 2008, there were 5.3 million immigrants corresponding to 8.5% of the total population in France (63.9 million in 2008). 42% were from Africa (30% from Maghreb and 12% from Sub-Saharan Africa), 38% from Europe (mainly from Portugal, Italy and Spain), 14% from Asia and 5% from the Americas and Oceania. Of this total, 40% have assumed French citizenship. In addition, 1.8 million people born in foreign countries (including 1 million in Maghreb) with French citizenship at birth were not included in this total.

There were also 6.7 million direct descendants of immigrants (born in France with at least one immigrant parent) living in France in 2008, corresponding to 11% of the total population in France. Immigrants aged 18–50 count for 2.7 million (10% of population aged 18–50) and 5.3 million for all ages (8% of population). 2nd Generation aged 18–50 make up 3.1 million (12% of 18–50) and 6.5 million for all ages (11% of population). The regions with the largest proportion of immigrants and direct descendants of immigrants are the Île-de-France and Provence-Alpes-Côte d'Azur/Languedoc-Roussillon, where more than one third and one quarter of the inhabitants respectively were either immigrants or direct descendants of immigrants.

The table shows immigrants and 2nd generation immigrants by origin in 2008. 3rd generation immigrants, illegal immigrants, as well as ethnic minorities like black people from the French overseas territories residing in metropolitan France (800,000), Roms (500,000) or people born in Maghreb with French citizenship at birth (about 4 million Maghrebi Jews, Harkis and Pied-Noir including their descendants live in France) were not taken into account.

In 2005, 18.1% of young people under 18 were of foreign origin (at least one immigrant parent) in France including 13.5% of non-European origin. Ile-de-France has the highest proportion at about 37%.

People under 18 of Maghrebi, Sub-saharian and Turkish origin became a majority in several cities of Ile-de-France  (Clichy-sous-Bois, Mantes-la-Jolie, Grigny, Saint-Denis, Les Mureaux, Saint-Ouen, Sarcelles, Pierrefitte-sur-Seine, Garges-lès-Gonesse, Aubervilliers, Stains, Gennevilliers et Épinay-sur-Seine) and in several arrondissements of Marseilles. In Grigny, 31% of young people are of Sub-saharian origin.

Between 2006 and 2008 about 22% of newborns in France had at least one foreign-born grandparent (9% born in another European country, 8% born in Maghreb and 3% born in another region of the world). In 2010, 27.3% of the 802,000 newborns in metropolitan France had at least one foreign-born parent. About one quarter (24%) of all the newborns had at least one parent born outside of Europe including about 17% from Africa (11% from Maghreb and 6% from Subsaharan Africa).

Posted workers of Europe
Regarding the country of origin of "posted workers", the same document states the origin of the posted workers: Poles represent the largest contingent of employees posted to France (18% of the total), followed by the Portuguese (15%) and Romania (13%). The majority of these employees, about 60% comes from the historical countries of the European Union, but the share from the new Member States "EU" is growing very rapidly, and the nationals of countries outside "EU "also increases.

Immigration per region
In France, the three largest cities (Paris, Lyon and Marseille) also attract the largest share of immigrants to the country. According to a study of the INSEE, in France, Immigrants are more concentrated in urban areas than the native population. 90.1% of the immigrant population is located in urban areas which is significantly more than the proportion for the native population, 81.9% of them living in urban areas. In 2012, 38.2% of the total immigrant population lived in the Parisian urban area compared to 4.1% and 3.1% respectively for Lyon and Marseille.

Île-de-France
The region with the largest proportion of immigrants is the Île-de-France (Greater Paris), where 40% of immigrants live. According to INSEE,  French National Institute for Statistics and Economic Studies, responsible for the production and analysis of official statistics in France, about 35% of people (4 million) living in Île-de-France, are either immigrant (17%) or born to at least one immigrant parent (18%) in 2006.

In the city of Paris, 20% of people living are immigrants and 41.3% of people under 20 have at least one immigrant parent. Among the young people under 18, 12.1% are of Maghrebi origin, 9.9% of Subsaharan African origin (not including blacks from French West Indies) and 4.0% of South European origin.

Reading: 436 576 immigrants live in Paris, representing 20% of Parisians and 22.4% of immigrants in Ile-de-France.
162 635 children under 20 with at least one immigrant parent live in Paris, representing 41.3% of the total of children under 20 in Paris
and 15.4% of the total of children under 20 with at least one immigrant parent in Ile-de-France.

Groups

Americans
Citizens of the United States of America total more than 100,000 permanent residents in France, Canadians 11,931, followed by Latin Americans are a growing sub-group the most numerous are the Brazilians 44,622, followed by Venezuelans 30,000, Peruvians 22,002, Chileans (esp. arrived in the 1970s) 15,782, and Argentineans 11,899 (or up to 15,000). Latin Americans are increasingly emigrating to France for economic reasons, study, work, family, and sometimes political asylum.

Europeans
In 2014 The National Institute of Statistics (INSEE, for its acronym in French) published a study on Thursday, according to which has doubled the number of Italian, Portuguese and Spanish immigrants in France between 2009 and 2012.
According to the French Institute, this increase resulting from the financial crisis that hit several European countries in that period, has pushed up the number of Europeans installed in France.
Statistics on Spanish immigrants in France show a growth of 107 percent between 2009 and 2012, i.e. in this period went from 5300 to 11,000 people.
Of the total of 229,000 foreigners arriving to France in 2012, nearly 8% were Portuguese, British 5%, Spanish 5%, Italians 4%, Germans 4%, Romanians 3%, and Belgians 3%.

With the increase of Italian, Portuguese and Spanish immigrants to France, the weight of European immigrants arrived in 2012 to 46 percent, while this percentage for African reached 30%, with a presence in Morocco (7%), Algeria (7%) and Tunisia (3%).
Meanwhile, 14 percent of all immigrants who settled in France that year were from Asian countries—3% of China and 2% in Turkey, while in America and Oceania constitute 10% of Americans and Brazilians accounted for higher percentage, 2 percent each.

Maghrebis
French of Maghrebi (either Arabs or Berbers) origin in France form the largest ethnic group after French of European origin.

According to Michèle Tribalat, a researcher at INED, there were 3.5 million people of Maghrebi origin (with at least one grandparent from Algeria, Morocco or Tunisia) living in France in 2005 corresponding to 5.8% of the total French metropolitan population (60.7 million in 2005). Maghrebis have settled mainly in the industrial regions in France, especially in the Paris region. Many famous French people like Edith Piaf, Isabelle Adjani, Arnaud Montebourg, Alain Bashung, Dany Boon, Zinedine Zidane and Karim Benzema  have Maghrebi ancestry.

Below is a table of population of Maghrebi origin in France, numbers are in thousands:

In 2005, the percentage of young people under 18 of Maghrebi origin (at least one immigrant parent) were about 7% in Metropolitan France, 12% in Greater Paris, 13% in Lyon, 21% in Perpignan, 22% in French département of Seine-Saint-Denis, 37% in 18th arrondissement of Paris and 40% in several arrondissements of Marseilles.

16% of newborns in France between 2006 and 2008 have at least one Maghrebi grandparent.

Their number increased in the following years.
According to other sources between 5 and 6 million people of Maghrebi origin live in France corresponding to about 7-9% of the total French metropolitan population.

As of 2011, there were 4.5 million Algerians in France of which 42% were women.

Illegal immigration
Illegal immigration to France has developed as the country's immigration policy has become more rigid. In 2006, The French Ministry of the Interior estimated clandestine immigrants ("sans-papiers ") in France numbered anywhere between 200,000 and 400,000, also expecting between 80,000 and 100,000 people to enter the country illegally each year.

In 2011, 28,000 illegal immigrants were expelled from France. The French government set a goal of 35,000 for 2012.

The French government threatened to withdraw from the Schengen accord in 2009, 2011 and 2012.

As of 2016, many undocumented immigrants tried to jump the fences at Calais and board a train or truck heading for Britain. The Home Office has agents working alongside French police and immigration agents to prevent unauthorized people from entering the British border zone.

Citizenship

Children born in France to foreign parents are automatically granted French citizenship upon reaching the age of 18. People born abroad and living in France can acquire French citizenship if they satisfy certain conditions. In 2009 the number of naturalised persons was 135,000, mainly from Maghreb (41.2%). People who have worked in the French military can also get French citizenship.

Comparison with other European Union countries 2010
According to Eurostat 47.3 million people lived in the European Union in 2010 who were born outside their resident country. This corresponds to 9.4% of the total EU population. Of these, 31.4 million (6.3%) were born outside the EU and 16.0 million (3.2%) were born in another EU member state.

See also
Demographics of France
List of French people of immigrant origin
French nationality law
List of countries by immigrant population
List of sovereign states and dependent territories by fertility rate

References

External links
 French government website on immigration
 Foreigners - Immigrants, INSEE
 Les immigrés en France, Autorité de la statistique publique, 2011
 Focus-Migration: France 2005 
 Le film: deux siècles d'histoire de l'immigration en France 
 De 1945 à 1975

Bibliography
 Antonio Bechelloni, Michel Dreyfus, Pierre Milza (eds), L'intégration italienne en France. Un siècle de présence italienne dans trois régions françaises (1880-1980), Bruxelles, Complexe, 1995.
 Rogers Brubaker, Citizenship and Nationhood in France and Germany, Cambridge, Harvard University Press, 1992.
 Marie-Claude Blanc-Chaléard, Les Italiens dans l'Est parisien: Une histoire d'intégration (1880-1960), Rome, École Française de Rome, 2000.
 Emmanuel Blanchard, La police parisienne et les Algériens, 1944-1962, Paris, Nouveau Monde Éditions, 2011.
 Stéphane Dufoix, Politiques d'exil: Hongrois, Polonais et Tchécoslovaques en France après 1945, Paris, Presses Universitaires de France, 2002.
 Jean-Philippe Dedieu, La parole immigrée. Les migrants africains dans l'espace public en France (1960 - 1995), Paris, Klincksieck, 2012.
 Yvan Gastaut, L’immigration et l’opinion en France sous la Ve République, Paris, Seuil, 2000.
 Abdellali Hajjat, Les frontières de l'« identité nationale ». L'injonction à l'assimilation en France métropolitaine et coloniale, Paris, La Découverte, 2012.
 Goebel, Michael. Anti-Imperial Metropolis: Interwar Paris and the Seeds of Third World Nationalism, Cambridge, Cambridge University Press, 2015. excerpts
 Nancy L. Green, Les Travailleurs immigrés juifs à la Belle époque. Le ‘‘Pletzl’’de Paris, Paris, Fayard, 1985.
 Donald L. Horowitz, Gérard Noiriel(eds), Immigrants in Two Democracies: French and American Experience, New York, New York University press, 1992.
 Gregory Mann, Native Sons. West African Veterans and France in the Twentieth Century, Durham, Duke University Press, 2006.
 Gérard Noiriel, Le Creuset français. Histoire de l'immigration XIXe-XXe, Paris, Le Seuil, 1988.
 Gérard Noiriel, Réfugiés et sans-papiers. La République face au droit d’asile. XIXe-XXe, Paris, Hachette littératures, 1998.
 Janine Ponty, Polonais méconnus. Histoire des travailleurs immigrés en France dans l’entre-deux-guerres, Paris, Publications de la Sorbonne, 1988.
 Judith Rainhorn, Paris, New York. Des migrants italiens (années 1880 – années 1930), Paris, CNRS Éditions, 2005.
 Philippe Rygiel, Destins immigrés: Cher 1920-1980, trajectoires d'immigrés d'Europe, Besançon, Presses universitaires franc-comtoises, 2001.
 Ralph Schor, Histoire de l’immigration en France de la fin du XIXe à nos jours, Paris, Armand Colin, 1996.
 Alexis Spire, Étrangers à la carte. L'administration de l'immigration en France, 1945-1975, Paris, Grasset, 2005.
 Benjamin Stora, Ils venaient d'Algérie: L'immigration algérienne en France (1912-1992), Paris, Fayard, 1992.
 Vincent Viet, La France immigrée. Construction d’une politique (1914-1997), Paris, Fayard, 1998.
 Patrick Weil, La France et ses étrangers : L'aventure d'une politique de l'immigration de 1938 à nos jours, Paris, Gallimard, 2005.
 Patrick Weil, Qu’est-ce qu’un Français ? Histoire de la nationalité française depuis la Révolution, Paris, Grasset, 2002.
 Patrick Weil, Immigration, Intégration, discrimination, Paris, Le Seuil, 2005.
 Claire Zalc, Melting Shops. Une histoire des commerçants étrangers en France, Paris, Perrin, 2010.